Chishti Sharif District, also known as Chisht District, is the most easterly district in Herat Province, Afghanistan, situated along the Hari River and one of its northern tributaries. It borders with Obe District to the west, Badghis Province to the north and Ghor Province to the east and south. The population was estimated at 23,100 in 2012. The district administrative center is the village of Chishti Sharif.

Infrastructure 
The district contains  of gravel roads.

See also 
Districts of Afghanistan

References

External links
 Map of Settlements IMMAP, September 2011

Districts of Herat Province
Chishti Order